Vilma 'Ronalyn' Greenlees (born 1971) is an Philippines international lawn bowler.

Biography
She reached the final eight in the pairs at the 2008 World Outdoor Bowls Championship but came to prominence when winning the triples gold medal at the 2015 Asia Pacific Bowls Championships.

She won the bronze medal at the 2016 World Outdoor Bowls Championship in Christchurch in the fours with Hazel Jagonoy, Rosita Bradborn and Sonia Bruce.

In 2020 she was selected for the 2020 World Outdoor Bowls Championship in Australia.

References

1971 births
Filipino female lawn bowls players
Living people
Sportspeople from Camarines Sur
Southeast Asian Games medalists in lawn bowls
Southeast Asian Games bronze medalists for the Philippines
Southeast Asian Games silver medalists for the Philippines
Competitors at the 2005 Southeast Asian Games
Competitors at the 2007 Southeast Asian Games
Competitors at the 2017 Southeast Asian Games
Competitors at the 2019 Southeast Asian Games